Kathy Orr may refer to:

 Kathy Orr (meteorologist), chief meteorologist
 Kathy Orr (writer), Canadian romance writer